Allen is a village in County Kildare in Ireland located on regional road R415 between Kilmeage and Milltown. The village is overlooked by Hill of Allen, which in recent times has been scarred by quarrying. This hill, visible over much of Kildare and the surrounding counties, is regarded as the ancient seat of Fionn mac Cumhaill.

History
In AD 722 The Battle of Allen took place between  the Leinstermen, commanded  by their King, Murchad mac Brain Mut and the northern and southern Uí Néill, commanded by Fergal mac Máele Dúin, along with his son Aedh Allen, and Aedh Laighean, King of Uí Maine in Connacht.

See also
 List of towns and villages in Ireland
 Allenwood
 Hill of Allen
 Bog of Allen

Towns and villages in County Kildare